Hieronymus Francken III (1611 in Antwerp – 1671 in Antwerp), was a Flemish Baroque painter and a well known member of the Francken family of artists.

Life
He was the son of Frans Francken II and Elisabeth Placquet and painted in the family tradition of religious works and historical allegories. He was the father of Constantijn Francken but he died before he could teach him to paint.

Family tree

References

1611 births
1671 deaths
Flemish Baroque painters
Artists from Antwerp
Hieronymus